The 12th Legislative Assembly of Ontario was in session from June 8, 1908, until November 13, 1911, just prior to the 1911 general election. The majority party was the Ontario Conservative Party  led by Sir James P. Whitney.

Thomas Crawford served as speaker for the assembly.

Notes

References 
Members in Parliament 12 

Terms of the Legislative Assembly of Ontario
1905 establishments in Ontario
1911 disestablishments in Ontario